The following is a list of songs by the American alternative metal band Flyleaf.

 
Flyleaf